"Treehouse" is a song by British singer-songwriter James Arthur, American singer Ty Dolla Sign and British rapper Shotty Horroh. It was released as a digital download and for streaming on 6 September 2019, as the fourth single from Arthur's third album You.

Background
In a statement, James Arthur said: "Treehouse is a song about surrendering – going to a safe place, a sanctuary where you can get away from your troubles. The sentiment is 'it's okay not to be okay', just take a load off and go to your happy place. The line 'I don't know why you don't ask for help' could be directed at me, but everyone feels life getting on top of them at times. That’s the message I want to share. It's an inclusive song, not a personal one". In an interview with the Official Charts Company, Arthur acknowledged that the song was a "change of pace" for him, and remarked that "My hardcore fans know I'm a huge hip-hop fan[,] and that's where my heart is. [...] I've been hard-positioned as this guy who just does ballads – that's not me at all. I enjoy taking on a lot of styles. It had to be something like this".

Music video
A music video to accompany the release of "Treehouse" was first released onto YouTube on 6 September 2019.

Track listing

Charts

Release history

References

2019 singles
2019 songs
James Arthur songs
Songs written by Nic Nac
Songs written by James Arthur